Ifito is a rural municipality in the district of Toamasina II (district), in the region of Atsinanana, on east coast of Madagascar.

Geography
It lies at the Ivondro River.

Economy
The economy is based on agriculture. The municipality is famous for its hemp plantations.

References

mg:Ifito
Populated places in Atsinanana